Bobby Bentley (born August 30, 1968) is an American football coach and former player. He currently serves as wide receivers coach and passing game coordinator at the University of South Florida. He was one of the nation's most successful high school coaches before accepting his first collegiate coaching position at Presbyterian.

Playing career
Bentley played football at Presbyterian College before graduating in 1990.

Coaching career
Bentley was named head coach at Presbyterian College (PC) in January 2007.  Returning to his alma mater to lead the school in its transition from Division II to Division Football Championship Subdivision, Bentley's team compiled a 6–5 record in his first season followed by a 4–8 season in 2008.

Before arriving at Presbyterian, Bentley was head coach for 11 seasons at James F. Byrnes High School in Duncan, South Carolina after serving five years as an assistant coach. During his tenure at Byrnes, he led the school to four consecutive AAAA Division II state championships from 2002 to 2005.

Bentley left PC to come back at Byrnes High School, which left to become offensive analyst at Auburn University. After a year in that position, in December 2015, Bentley accepted a coaching position with the University of South Carolina as the running back coach. His son, Jake Bentley, graduated high school early and enrolled at the University of South Carolina where he was the quarterback for the Gamecocks until injury sidelined him during the first game of the 2019 season.  He spent the 2020 season as a graduate transfer quarterback at the University of Utah.  He has since once again entered the transfer portal

In December 2020, Bentley was replaced as tight ends coach by Erik Kimrey.  He is not expected to be retained on new head coach Shane Beamer's staff.

Personal life
Bentley has five children: Chas, Shuler, Jake, Brooks, and Emily.

Head coaching record

College

References

External links
 South Carolina profile

1968 births
Living people
American football quarterbacks
Auburn Tigers football coaches
Presbyterian Blue Hose football coaches
Presbyterian Blue Hose football players
South Carolina Gamecocks football coaches
High school football coaches in South Carolina
People from Duncan, South Carolina